Bloomsbury Street is a street in the Bloomsbury district of the London Borough of Camden that runs from Gower Street in the north to the junction of New Oxford Street and Shaftesbury Avenue in the south.

Listed buildings
Bloomsbury Street contains three listed buildings:
Numbers 1, 3 and 5 at the southern end on the western side.
Number 10 and attached railings on the eastern side.
Numbers 24-60 and the attached railings on the eastern side.

Notable people
In 1907, the postcard publisher Frederick Hartmann was living at number 5.

References

External links 

Streets in the London Borough of Camden